Takyeh Beyglarbeygi is a takyeh located in Kermanshah. this construction is well known for unique mirror decoration. Takyeh Beyglarbeygi was made during Qajar dynasty by efforts of Abdullah khan Biglarbeygi. here has inscriptions of Mozaffar ad-Din Shah Qajar. Of course, this place is not used for mourning today, but it has been turned into a museum of calligraphy as well as old documents of the Biglarbeygi family.
This place has been registered in the list of national monuments on December 10, 1996, number 1797. In 2001, it purchased its cultural heritage and was restored in 2002 and 2003, and in 2004, it was opened as a museum of calligraphy. In 2008, the Zagros Paleolithic Museum was inaugurated by the cultural heritage on the south side.

Gallery

References 

Takyehs
Tourist attractions in Kermanshah Province
Buildings and structures in Kermanshah